The California Department of General Services (DGS) is a state government agency in the California Government Operations Agency of the executive branch of the government of California in the United States.  It provides a large number of services to other agencies in the government of California, playing a role that is similar to that played by the General Services Administration for the federal government of the United States.

Since 2001, DGS headquarters has been located at The Ziggurat in West Sacramento.

See also

California Green Lodging Program

References

External links
Department of General Services
 Department of General Services in Title 2 of the California Code of Regulations
 Department of General Services in Title 21 of the California Code of Regulations
 Office of Administrative Hearings in Title 1 of the California Code of Regulations

General Services